Rutherford Falls is an American sitcom television series that premiered on the streaming service Peacock on April 22, 2021. It was created by Ed Helms, Michael Schur, and Sierra Teller Ornelas. In July 2021, the series was renewed for a second season, which was released on June 16, 2022.

In September 2022, the series was canceled after two seasons.

Premise
The series is a comedy about two lifelong friends, Nathan Rutherford (Ed Helms) and Reagan Wells (Jana Schmieding), whose relationship is tested when a crisis hits their fictional small town. After the mayor decides to move a statue of Nathan's ancestor, the town founder, because drivers keep hitting it, Nathan begins a quest to keep the statue in its place. Reagan has to juggle loyalty to her friend and to her people, the (fictional) Minishonka Nation. She wants to develop a cultural center to highlight their history, and Rutherford's ancestor has become known for attacks on her people in the colonial era.

Terry Thomas (Michael Greyeyes) is the CEO of the Minishonka casino, and he is interested in gaining power for his people and family.

Cast

Main
 Ed Helms as Nathan Rutherford, who runs the town's heritage museum and is a descendant of the town's founder 
 Jana Schmieding (Cheyenne River Sioux) as Reagan Wells, Nathan's best friend and a Minishonka, who dreams of championing the history of her people
 Michael Greyeyes (Muskeg Lake Cree Nation) as Terry Thomas, the C.E.O. of the Minishonka casino, who envisions big things for both Reagan Wells and their Nation
 Jesse Leigh as Bobbie Yang, an ambitious high school student who works as Nathan's personal assistant
 Dustin Milligan as Josh Carter, an NPR journalist seeking to reveal the real story of Rutherford Falls

Recurring
Dana L. Wilson as Deirdre Chisenhall, Mayor of Rutherford Falls (season 1)
Bobby Wilson (Sisseton Wahpeton Dakota) as Wayne, a casino employee
Beth Stelling as Peggy Fish, a teacher with a crush on Nathan
Geraldine Keams (Diné) as Rayanne
Ben Koldyke as Dudley 'Duz' Rutherford, Nathan's brother
Migizi Pensoneau (Ponca/Ojibwe) as Roy Crooks, CEO of Spirit Pond Resort, Casino, Indoor Water Park, and Dispensary
Adam Farabee as Charlie Cromwell
Mimi Gianopulos as Kaitlyn, Vice President of Communications at Rutherford Inc.
Jason Grasl as Forest Grant
Chevonne Hughes as Bonnie
Devery Jacobs (Kahnawake Mohawk) as Jess Wells, Reagan's cousin and Terry's assistant
Julia Jones as Sally, a casino employee
Monica Padman as Melanie, Kaitlyn's assistant
Camille Schurer as Madison
Paul F. Tompkins as Professor Tobias James Kaufman
Kiawentiio (Mohawk) as Maya Thomas, Terry's daughter
Martin Sensmeier (Alaska Native) as Ray, Reagan's ex-fiancée
Kaniehtiio Horn (Kahnawake Mohawk) as Feather Day, mayoral candidate (season 2)
Dallas Goldtooth (Mdewakanton Dakota/Diné) as Nelson, newly hired museum curator and Reagan's new love interest (season 2)

Episodes

Series overview

Season 1 (2021)

Season 2 (2022)

Production

Development

The series was created by Ed Helms, Michael Schur, and Sierra Teller Ornelas. The initial idea came from discussions between Helms and Schur (who had previously worked together on The Office), and once they had decided on a Native American theme, they asked Ornelas to get involved and serve as showrunner. Schur had worked with her previously on Brooklyn Nine-Nine.

After delays due to the COVID-19 pandemic, the series announced in August 2020 their intentions to begin filming in Los Angeles in early September. On July 8, 2021, Peacock renewed the series for a second season.

The writers' room features one of the largest Indigenous writing staffs on American television, with five writers being of Indigenous heritage. Teller Ornelas recruited Native writers from many different sources. She hired Bobby Wilson of the 1491s, who also acts in the show, after laughing at a post he made on Instagram. Teller Ornelas said she had previously been told there wasn't enough Native American writing or acting talent to make a Native-themed sitcom, but told The New York Times, "It’s not true. We found more Native writers than we could staff and multiple actors for each role. It was an embarrassment of riches."

On September 2, 2022, Peacock announced that it would not be renewing the show for a third season, effectively cancelling it after two seasons.

Casting
When the series was announced in November 2019, it was reported that co-creator Ed Helms would be starring in the series. On August 10, 2020, as part of a virtual press tour, the principal cast was announced as Jana Schmieding, Michael Greyeyes, Jesse Leigh, and Dustin Milligan.

Release
On March 16, 2021, the series released its first trailer. On April 22, Peacock released all ten episodes of the series' first season.

Reception
Reviews of the show's first season were generally positive. Rotten Tomatoes gave the series a score of 94% based on 36 critics with an average rating of 7.20/10. The website's critical consensus reads, "Though it takes a few episodes to find its footing, a winsome ensemble, witty writing, and a willingness to engage with complex issues facing Indigenous peoples in modern America make Rutherford Falls a place worth visiting." Metacritic gave the series a score of 66 out of 100 indicating "generally favorable reviews" based on 17 critics.

Based on the first four episodes of the series, Jen Chaney of Vulture.com said the show "skillfully braids discussions of serious sociocultural issues with character-based comedy in ways that seem neither forced nor overly didactic." Saloni Gajjar of The A.V. Club gave the series a grade of "A−" and said the show "is distinguished by a sincere attempt to depict previously untold narratives without falling into a trap of stereotypes" and praised its "vibrant, heartwarming spirit."

See also
Removal of Confederate monuments and memorials

References

External links
 
 
 
An interview with the show creators from CBC Radio
An interview with Greyeyes from The Globe and Mail

Peacock (streaming service) original programming
2020s American sitcoms
2020s American political comedy television series
2021 American television series debuts
2022 American television series endings
Museums in popular culture
Television productions postponed due to the COVID-19 pandemic
Television series set in the 2020s
Television shows set in New York (state)
Television series created by Michael Schur
Television series by Universal Television
Television series by 3 Arts Entertainment
Television series by Fremulon
Television shows about Native Americans
Native American television series